The Democratic Party of Namibia is a political party in Namibia, launched in July 2008 at Keetmanshoop. 

Although it constitutes an initiative of the Nama people, the party plans to focus on all ethnic minorities in Namibia. It positions itself in clear opposition to SWAPO, the currently ruling party of Namibia. The party's interim president is Salomon Dawid Isaacs.

Election results
The DPN contested the 2009 general election. It finished in eleventh of fourteen parties in voting for the National Assembly of Namibia and did not win a seat. The party's candidate for president, David Isaacs, finished tenth of twelve candidates.

The party won a seat in the 2010 local elections in the Karasburg City Council. In January 2011, the party suspended two members, including an executive committee member, for siding with SWAPO against the directive of the party's central committee during the internal city council elections in Karasburg. Another member had been removed from the council but later re-added after showing remorse.

The party's election results further deteriorated in 2014 where it finished last. It did not contest the 2019 Namibian general election.

References

Political parties established in 2008
2008 establishments in Namibia
Political parties in Namibia
Nama people